Jilmar Augustinho Tatto (born 25 June 1965) is a Brazilian politician  affiliated to Workers' Party (PT) since 1981. He is the brother of the São Paulo state deputy Enio Tatto and São Paulo councilors Arselino and Jair Tatto.  He is graduated in History from the Faculty of Philosophy Sciences and Languages of Moema and was militant at Basic Ecclesial Communities in Socorro. He was elected president of the Sao Paulo directory in 1995, elected São Paulo state deputy in 1998, and he held positions at the secretariat of the city of Sao Paulo in Marta Suplicy's administration.

References

|-

|-

|-

1965 births
Workers' Party (Brazil) politicians
Members of the Chamber of Deputies (Brazil) from São Paulo
Living people